Thibault Benistant (born 31 July 2002) is a French professional motocross rider. He won several European Motocross Championship (EMX 125 in 2018 and EMX 250 in 2020).

References

External links
 Thibault Benistant at MXGP web site
 Thibault Benistant at Monster Energy Yamaha Factory web site
 

Living people
2002 births
French motocross riders